Dring's horned toad ("Megophrys dringi"), or Dring's horned frog, is a species of frog in the family Megophryidae found in Mount Mulu is Sarawak, Borneo (Malaysia).
Its natural habitats are tropical moist montane forests and rivers.

References

Megophrys
Amphibians of Malaysia
Endemic fauna of Malaysia
Endemic fauna of Borneo
Taxonomy articles created by Polbot
Amphibians described in 1995
Amphibians of Borneo